The USA Today Super Bowl Ad Meter is an annual survey taken of television commercials by USA Today in a live poll during the telecast in the United States of the Super Bowl, the annual professional American football championship game of the National Football League.  The survey, which started in 1989, uses a live response on a zero-to-ten scale (zero being the worst, ten the best) of focus groups based in McLean, Virginia, the newspaper headquarters and one (or more) site(s) around the country.

Background

The Super Bowl became the must-see event for advertisers during the third quarter of  the telecast of Super Bowl XVIII on CBS, when Apple Computer debuted a one-time-only advertisement for their Macintosh computer titled 1984, directed by Ridley Scott. As the Los Angeles Raiders routed the Washington Redskins, 38–9, the Apple commercial, not the game, was the most-talked about item around water coolers the very next day.  Since then, major advertisers have used the game, paying as much as seven figures (averaging over US $5 million for one 30-second slot ), excluding production expenses) to showcase their work and generate buzz that many people tune into television's biggest event of the year just to watch the commercials, not the actual game.  For those reasons, USA Today started the Ad Meter, a poll that gives live responses per second of each commercial. According to the newspaper, ads by rule are limited to those shown during the game - from opening kickoff to the end of the game, excluding those shown at halftime or local commercials - are officially qualified for consideration in the Ad Meter survey.

A new element was added for 2012, as users of Facebook and those logging onto the USA Today website were involved in a second survey that lasted until February 7 at 6:00 pm US EST.  The online element was added to the regular meter for 2013.

Past winners

Multiple winners
Anheuser-Busch (Budweiser, Bud Light brands) - 14 (1999-2008, 2011, 2013–15)
PepsiCo (Pepsi-Cola and Diet Pepsi drink brands, Frito-Lay Doritos) -10 (1991, 1994–98, 2009, 2011–12)
Hyundai Motor Group (Hyundai, Kia brands) - 2 (2016–17)
Nike - 2 (1990–92)
Rocket Mortgage - 2 (2021–22)

See also
 Adbowl - A popular website with a similar system

References

External links
USA Todays Ad Meter website

^Ad Meter
USA Today